This is a list of the 16 counties in the U.S. state of Maine. Before statehood, Maine was officially part of the state of Massachusetts and was called the District of Maine. Maine was granted statehood on March 15, 1820, as part of the Missouri Compromise. 9 of the 16 counties had their borders defined while Maine was still part of Massachusetts, and hence are older than the state itself. Even after 1820, the exact location of the northern border of Maine was disputed with Britain, until the question was settled and the northern counties signed their final official form, the Webster–Ashburton Treaty, signed in 1842. Almost all of Aroostook County was disputed land until the treaty was signed.

The first county to be created was York County, created as York County, Massachusetts, by the government of the Massachusetts Bay Colony in 1652 to govern territories it claimed in southern Maine.  No new counties have been created since 1860, when Knox County and Sagadahoc County were created. The most populous counties tend to be located in the southeastern portion of the state, along the Atlantic seaboard. The largest counties in terms of land area are inland and further north. Maine's county names come from a mix of British, American, and Native American sources, reflecting Maine's pre-colonial, colonial, and national heritage.

The Federal Information Processing Standard (FIPS) code, which is used by the United States government to uniquely identify states and counties, is provided with each entry. Maine's code is 23, which when combined with any county code would be written as 23XXX. The FIPS code for each county links to census data for that county.


Alphabetical list

|}

Song
A song is taught to many elementary school children across the state, titled the Maine County Song, to aid in memorizing the names of the state's 16 counties. It is sung to the tune of "Yankee Doodle".

An alternate version as put forth by the Maine Secretary of State's Kids' Page:

References

Maine, List of counties in
 
county